Misbakus Solikin (born 1 September 1992) is an Indonesian professional footballer who plays as a central midfielder for Liga 1 club Borneo.

Career statistics

Club

Honours

Club 
Persebaya Surabaya
 Liga 2: 2017
 Liga 1 runner-up: 2019
 Indonesia President's Cup runner-up: 2019
PSS Sleman

 Menpora Cup third place: 2021

References

External links
 
 Misbakus Solikin at Liga Indonesia

1992 births
Living people
Indonesian footballers
Association football midfielders
Persebaya Surabaya players
PSS Sleman players
Borneo F.C. players
Liga 2 (Indonesia) players
Liga 1 (Indonesia) players
People from Surabaya
Sportspeople from East Java
Sportspeople from Surabaya